The Gainestown Schoolhouse is a historic school building on Clarke County Road 29 in Gainestown, Alabama.  It was built in 1919 as a one-room schoolhouse and now serves as a guesthouse for the Wilson-Finlay House across the road.  It was placed on the National Register of Historic Places on October 1, 1992, due to its architectural significance.

Architecture
The form is like that of most late 19th century school buildings in Alabama, namely a one-story frame, rectangular-shaped building with a front gabled roof.  A single entrance is found on the gabled front and a row of
windows on each side elevation.

The building was expanded to two rooms in 1930, with the addition of a western side-wing.  The large gabled wing turned the schoolhouse into a T-shaped building.

References

National Register of Historic Places in Clarke County, Alabama
School buildings on the National Register of Historic Places in Alabama
1919 establishments in Alabama
One-room schoolhouses in Alabama
Defunct schools in Alabama
Educational institutions established in 1919
Vernacular architecture in Alabama
Schoolhouses in the United States